Seward Park may refer to:

 Seward Park (Manhattan), a park on the Lower East Side of Manhattan, named after William H. Seward
 Seward Park (Seattle), a park in Seattle, Washington
 Seward Park, Seattle, the surrounding neighborhood